Paddy Greenwood (born 17 October 1946) is an English retired professional footballer who played in England and the United States as a left back.

Career
Born in Hull, Greenwood began his career with the youth teams of hometown club Hull City. He turned professional in 1965, and later played for Barnsley and Nottingham Forest. Greenwood also played  in the NASL for the Boston Minutemen.

External links
Player profile at Post War English & Scottish Football League A - Z Player's Transfer Database
NASL career stats

1946 births
Living people
English footballers
Hull City A.F.C. players
Barnsley F.C. players
Nottingham Forest F.C. players
North American Soccer League (1968–1984) players
Boston Minutemen players
Association football fullbacks
English expatriate sportspeople in the United States
Expatriate soccer players in the United States
English expatriate footballers